Joraku-ji  (Joraku Temple) (Japanese: 常楽寺) is a Koyasan Shingon temple in Tokushima, Tokushima Prefecture, Japan. Temple # 14 on the Shikoku 88 temple pilgrimage. The main image is of Miroku Bosatsu (Maitreya Bodhisattva).

History
The temple was built during the Kōnin (弘仁)  era (810-824 CE).
In the Tenshō (天正) era, the temple was destroyed by Chōsokabe Motochika's (長宗我部 元親) force.
In the Manji (万治) era, the temple was rebuilt with the support of Hachisuka clan (蜂須賀氏).
In the Bunka (文化) era, the temple was moved to the present location.

Cultural properties
The temple's main hall and master's hall were designated as Tangible Cultural Properties of Japan on July 25, 2011.

References

 四国八十八箇所霊場会編 『先達教典』 2006年

External links
 第14番札所 盛寿山 延命院 常楽寺（四国八十八ヶ所霊場会公式）
 第14番札所・常楽寺（徳島市）

Buddhist pilgrimage sites in Japan
Buddhist temples in Tokushima Prefecture